The 2014 Toyota Premier Cup was the 4th Toyota Premier Cup. It's a single-game cup competition organized by the Toyota  and Football Association of Thailand. It features Buriram United the winners of the 2013 Thai League Cup and Nagoya Grampus an invited team from the 2013 J.League Division 1 (Japan). It features at Thammasat Stadium. It is sponsored by Toyota Motor (Thailand) Co., Ltd.

Details

References

News from Goal.com(Thailand). Result Toyota Premier Cup 2014.
News from Thairath. Buriram United VS. Nagoya Grampus.
Highlight from Youtube Karuna Production.

2014
2014